North of 36 is a 1924 American silent Western film produced by Famous Players-Lasky and distributed by Paramount Pictures. The film is based on the novel, North of 36, by Emerson Hough. The film was directed by Irvin Willat and stars Jack Holt and Lois Wilson. This film was preserved in the Library of Congress in the 1970s and has been restored by that archive with a new screening of the restored film in the summer of 2011 in upstate New York.

Plot
As described in a review in a film magazine, Sim Rudabaugh (Beery), ex-outlaw and Treasurer of Texas in the early days, plots to corner the script which represents the rich cattle lands. He particularly covets the last great ranch, owned by Taisie Lockhart (Wilson). Taisie has not the money to pay her riders, but they refuse to be discharged. There comes Dan McMasters (Holt), whose father was an old friend of Lockhart’s. He brings word that the railroad has been pushed through to Abilene. If they can get their cattle to the railhead, they can realize upon their potential riches — but it is a thousand miles across Indian country. Taisie decides to take the chance. Dan offers his escort, but circumstances raise the suspicion he and not Rudabaugh is trying to get Taisie’s land-script. He is driven off and joins up with Rudabaugh, to spy upon his plans and foil his evil devices. During a night attack the cattle are stampeded but are stopped by the cowmen, headed by Jim Nabours (Torrence), the foreman, and at last reach Abilene, where their arrival is made a gala event. Dan wins Taisie, Sim is given to the Comanche chief, whose wives he has slain, and Jim attains the longed for dignity of a boiled shirt.

Cast

 Jack Holt as Don McMasters
 Ernest Torrence as Jim Nabours
 Lois Wilson as Taisie Lockheart
 Noah Beery as Slim Rudabaugh
 David Dunbar as Dell Williams
 Stephen Carr as Cinquo Centavos
 Guy Oliver as Major McCoyne
 William Carroll as Sanchez
 Clarence Geldart as Colonel Griswold
 George Irving as Pattison
 Ella Miller as Milly

See also
 The Conquering Horde (1931)
 The Texans (1938)

References

External links

 
 
 
 North of 36 lobby poster
 Stills at silenthollywood.com
 Still at Getty Images

1924 films
1924 Western (genre) films
American black-and-white films
Famous Players-Lasky films
Films directed by Irvin Willat
Films based on American novels
Films based on Western (genre) novels
Silent American Western (genre) films
1920s American films
1920s English-language films